Third Time Around is an album by American jazz group David Becker Tribune, released in 1990.

Background
At AllMusic, critic Alex Henderson gave the album four out of five stars and complimented the band's accessible, melodic fusion of rock and jazz.

Track listing
All writing by David Becker except where indicated

 "Rios" (David Becker, Bruce Becker)
 "Ensenada"
 "Drivin' Home" (David Becker, Bob Mair)
 "Farewell"
 "Be Right Back"
 "Denpasar" (David Becker, Bruce Becker, Bob Mair)
 "Wallofguitar"
 "Song for J.B."
 "With You in Mine"

Personnel
 David Becker – acoustic electric guitars, keyboards
 Bob Mair – fretless bass, keyboards
 Bruce Becker – drums, percussion
 Gary Gardner – percussion
 Richie Gajate-Garcia – percussion

References

1990 albums